Goodenia gypsicola  is a species of flowering plant in the family Goodeniaceae and is endemic to areas of salt lakes in inland Australia. It is a perennial herb with spatula-shaped leaves and racemes of pale blue flowers.

Description
Flowering occurs in October.

Taxonomy and naming
Goodenia gypsicola was first formally described in 2000 by David Eric Symon in the Journal of the Adelaide Botanic Gardens. The specific epithet (gypsicola) means "gypsum-inhabiting".

Distribution and habitat
This goodenia grows in consolidated gypsum in scattered salt lakes in Western Australia and in the Serpentine Lakes area of South Australia.

Conservation status
Goodenia gypsicola is classified as "not threatened" by the Government of Western Australia Department of Parks and Wildlife.

References

gypsicola
Eudicots of Western Australia
Plants described in 2000
Flora of South Australia
Endemic flora of Australia